Iapygia may refer to:
Iapygia quadrangle, a region of Mars
Iapygians, an ancient people from Italy who lived in the region Iapygia